Shojaabad (also Romanized as Shojā‘ābād; also known as Shuja‘ābād) is a village in Khorram Dasht Rural District, in the Central District of Kashan County, Isfahan Province, Iran. At the 2006 census, its population was 68, in 25 families.

References 

Populated places in Kashan County